Bafang Dumpling is a Taiwanese restaurant chain. Outside Taiwan, Bafang Dumpling also has branches in China, Hong Kong, and the United States.

History

Founded in 1998 in Tianmu, Taipei by founder Lin Jiayu, Bafang Dumplings specialized in potstickers and dumplings as its main products. Since 2008, the restaurant chain has expanded to Hong Kong, and in 2014, it further expanded its overseas locations to mainland China. In September 2021, Bafang Yunji International Co., Ltd., the restaurant group of Bafang Dumpling, became a publicly traded company in Taiwan. Then, on 26 March 2022, the first store in the United States was opened in the City of Industry, California. As of May 2022, there were 998 stores in Taiwan and 1100 stores worldwide.

See also
 List of restaurants in China
 List of companies of Taiwan
 Din Tai Fung

References

External links

Bafang Dumpling official website (Global) 

1998 establishments in Taiwan
Taiwanese restaurants
Culture in Taipei
Restaurants established in 1998
Restaurant chains
Restaurant chains in China
Restaurant chains in Hong Kong
Restaurants in Greater Los Angeles
Restaurant chains in Taiwan
Taiwanese brands
Companies listed on the Taiwan Stock Exchange